Feyzabad (also Romanized as Feyẕābād) is a village in Mazul Rural District, in the Central District of Nishapur County, Razavi Khorasan Province, Iran. At the 2006 census, its population was 1,694, in 422 families.

References 

Populated places in Nishapur County